Ernest Asplan Beldam (30 June 1879 – 28 November 1958) was an English cricketer. He played 39 first-class matches for Middlesex between 1903 and 1907. His cousins Cyril Beldam and George Beldam were also cricketers.

See also
 List of Middlesex County Cricket Club players

References

External links
 

1879 births
1958 deaths
English cricketers
Middlesex cricketers
People from Brentford
Cricketers from Greater London
London County cricketers